Magdalena Matte Lecaros (born August 13, 1950) is a Chilean businesswoman and politician. She is member of the Independent Democratic Union (UDI) and was part of Chile's Ministry of Housing and Urban Development under Chile's former President Sebastián Piñera for the term of 2010–2014. She is a member of the Matte family.

Biography
Matte was born in Santiago. Her paternal grandmother, Rosa Ester Alessandri Rodríguez, was the daughter of Arturo Alessandri, Chile's president during 1920–1925 and 1932–1938.  Rosa was also the sister of Jorge Alessandri, President of Chile between 1958 and 1964. Her paternal grandfather, Arturo Matte Larraín, was a lawyer and congressman, Minister of the State, presidential candidate (1952), and a founder of forestal and paper company CMPC.

Matte lost her father, Arturo Matte Alessandri, in 1965 when she was 14 years of age.  She completed her schooling in Santiago's Colegio Santa Úrsula.  She completed her university studies in the Pontifical Catholic University of Chile majoring in civil engineering.  In 1974, she married Hernán Larraín Fernández, who is a Chilean Senator and former President of the Senate between 2004 and 2005, with whom she has six children.

Career
She has worked in the private sector, mainly in the company Papeleria Dimar, of which she has been both executive and investor.  In 2002, she worked with Fondo Confianza though the foundation La Vaca, wherein she aided in funding entrepreneurial women of low-economic resources.  She created 230 work and education centers which cater to 3,000 women in the area of El Maule Sur.

Politics
On February 9, 2010, Chile's then-President-elect Sebastián Piñera nominated Magdalena Matte as his Minister of Housing and Urban Development. On April 19, 2011, Magdalena stepped down as minister due to the suspect millionaire compensation payment to the construction company Kodama.

See also
 Kodama case

References

External links 
 

Living people
1950 births
Chilean businesspeople
Chilean civil engineers
Chilean people of Catalan descent
Chilean people of Italian descent
Chilean people of Spanish descent
Magdalena
Government ministers of Chile
Independent Democratic Union politicians
People from Santiago
Pontifical Catholic University of Chile alumni
Women government ministers of Chile
Chilean women engineers
Matte
Matte